Surviving High School was a visual novel game developed and published by Electronic Arts. It was originally released for mobile phones in 2005, later being made available for iPhone and iPod Touch in 2009 and for iPad and Android OS in 2011. New episodes were released and available for download on a weekly basis. It shared many similarities in terms of gameplay mechanics and visuals to its sister game, Cause of Death, which is also developed by EA Games. Some of the characters from Surviving High School now feature in the sister game High School Story by Pixelberry Studios. The character Autumn Brooks transferred out of the Surviving High School after being bullied, and now features heavily in High School Story, alongside other characters with minor roles such as Owen, Wes and Kimi. This ties in with a bullying theme carried through High School story and their partnership with The Cybersmile Foundation. Autumn's bullying storyline from Surviving High School enables her to help a student called Hope in High School Story, who is being cyberbullied; this storyline helps to raise awareness of the issue of bullying and cyberbullying in high school age students.

On April 30, 2014, it was announced during one of the episodes that the game would be ending soon. The final episode was released in July 2014.

Gameplay 
Surviving High School was a choice-based visual novel with elements of Choose your Own Adventure and interactive fiction. It followed Centerscore High, a typical high school with very recognizable cliques of students. Players control several unique Centerscore students throughout the game. They are given scenarios where they must choose between two or more decisions that may negatively or positively affect the outcome of each story. Stories are presented through episodes, which are grouped within volumes or sets. Volumes typically contain around eight episodes. Prior to the September 2012 update, the game came with two free playable stories: "The Football Star" and "The New Girl". While both allow the customization of the player character's name, only the former allows the changing of appearance. All further content must be purchased via the in-game store "More Episodes" or downloaded in the Now Airing feature.

The game received an update on September 5, 2012 which introduced a number of changes. It features a brand new on demand section entitled "more episodes" and the now airing section has been changed to "weekly free episodes". The update also replaces the original megapack with a new megapack entitled, Season 1: A New Start. Additional content may be purchased in the in-game store known as "More Episodes" which offers previous episodes, continuations to "The Football Star" and "The New Girl" stories, premium content, special episodes and classic Surviving High School Episodes. Every Thursday, a new episode is made available in the "More Episodes" section free of charge. However, these episodes can be purchased in advance from the "More Episodes" section.

Nintendo Week
The DS version of the game was referenced in the April 19th 2010 episode of Nintendo Week, where Allison goes to the roof after Dark Gary blows smelly smoke all over the studio. The episode can be seen here.

Reception
The game received a 7.4 out of 10 for its mobile phone version from GameSpot, a 7.8 out of 10 for its iPhone OS version from GameSpot, and a 6 out of 10 for its Nintendo DS version from IGN.

See also
Cause of Death
High School Story

References

External links
 Surviving High School Official Site

2005 video games
High school-themed video games
IOS games
Mobile games
DSiWare games
Electronic Arts games
Android (operating system) games
Video games developed in the United States